Shuri may refer to:

Places
 Shuri, Bhutan
 Shuri, Iran, a village in Razavi Khorasan Province, Iran
 Shuri, Okinawa, Japan, former capital of the Ryūkyū Kingdom
 Shuri Castle, Japan, former palace of the Ryūkyū Kingdom
 Shuri Station, Naha, Okinawa Prefecture, Japan

Other uses
 Shuri (character), a Marvel Comics superhero
 Shuri (Marvel Cinematic Universe), the Marvel Cinematic Universe adaptation
 Shuri Okuda (born 1989), Japanese professional wrestler

See also 
 Shuri-ryū, a style of karate
 Syuri (born 1989), ring name of Syuri Kondo, a Japanese professional wrestler, shoot boxer and kickboxer